Sepa language may refer to:
Sepa language (Papua New Guinea)
Sepa language (Papua Province)
Sepa language (Maluku)